Durban City development Football Club (2009) is a Durban club to the now defunct Durban City F.C. The club was revived in 2009 by Glen Adams and it is affiliated to the SAFA Ethekwini Region.

External links 
 https://sites.google.com/site/durbancityfootballschool/ Official website

Association football clubs established in 2009
Soccer clubs in Durban
2009 establishments in South Africa